Yousef Muhammad El Ghoul (June 1, 1936 – December 27, 1997) was a Libyan football referee. He is known for having refereed one match in the 1982 World Cup in Spain, between the USSR and New Zealand in Malaga. He was, and is still, the only Libyan to referee a match in FIFA World Cup.

References 
 Profile

1936 births
Libyan football referees
FIFA World Cup referees
1997 deaths
1982 FIFA World Cup referees